Mark Spiegler (born 1958/1959) is an American talent agent for pornographic actresses and founder of Spiegler Girls, which is often regarded as being among the adult film industry's top agencies.

Spiegler was inducted into the AVN Hall of Fame in 2012.

Early life 
Spiegler was raised in West Hollywood, California and attended Hollywood High School. He is Jewish. He graduated from California State University, Northridge with a Bachelor of Arts degree in economics and became a stock trader afterward.

Career 

Spiegler began working in the adult film industry as a production assistant in the 1980s, while in the 1990s he worked as a producer on 96 pornographic films.

Spiegler began working as an agent after French pornographic actress Lisa Crawford asked him to represent her. In 1999, he began working as an agent for Topp Models, but in 2003 he founded his own agency, Spiegler Girls, which is a member of the Licensed Adult Talent Agency Trade Association (LATATA).

Spiegler refers to himself as the "Patron of the Tarts" on his business cards. He has also been referred to as the "Ari Emanuel of porn" by several mainstream media outlets, such as The Hollywood Reporter and The Daily Beast. LA Weekly referred to him as the "Ari Gold of porn".

Spiegler has appeared on The Tyra Banks Show, The Burn with Jeff Ross and the German documentary film 9to5 – Days in Porn. Spiegler has also appeared on the No Jumper podcast hosted by internet personality Adam22.

In February 2009, Spiegler filed a $3 million lawsuit for defamation of character against pornographic film director Skeeter Kerkove, who alleged that Spiegler received oral sex from four of his clients (Jayna Oso, Katja Kassin, Melissa Lauren and Katsuni) in exchange for finding them work, but all four performers signed declarations, stating that the allegations made by Kerkove were false and Spiegler won $85,000 in damages in December 2010.

References

External links 

 Spiegler Girls
 

Film producers from California
American people of Jewish descent
American stock traders
American talent agents
California State University, Northridge alumni
Living people
People from West Hollywood, California
Hollywood High School alumni
Year of birth missing (living people)
1950s births